Cürəli or Dzhurali or Dzhuraly may refer to:
Aşağı Cürəli, Azerbaijan
Aşağı Cürəli (Ashagy Dzhurali), Azerbaijan
Yuxarı Cürəli, Azerbaijan